Ischnochitonida is an order of molluscs belonging to the class Polyplacophora.

Families:
 Callistoplacidae Pilsbry, 1893
 Callochitonidae Plate, 1901
 Chaetopleuridae Plate, 1899
 Chitonidae Rafinesque, 1815
 †Gryphochitonidae
 Ischnochitonidae Dall, 1889
 Loricidae Iredale & Hull, 1923
 Mopaliidae Dall, 1889
 †Ochmazochitonidae
 Schizochitonidae Dall, 1889
 Schizoplacidae Bergenhayn, 1955
 Subterenochitonidae
 Tonicellidae Simroth, 1894

References

Chitons
Mollusc orders